Samuel Brabham is an Australian racing driver. Brabham is a third-generation racing driver; he is the son of David Brabham, nephew to Geoff Brabham, Gary Brabham, Mike Thackwell, and the grandson of three time Formula One World Champion Sir Jack Brabham. He is also the cousin of Matthew Brabham.

Career
He started off in karts in 2011 aged 16 and quickly proceeded to the British Formula Ford Championship in 2013 finishing fourth in the championship and second in the scholarship class. He joined the MRF Formula 2000 Challenge in late 2013 for his first taste of 'wings & slicks' formula finishing ninth for the series.

In 2018, he returned to the track in the 2018 Porsche Carrera Cup Great Britain Pro Am class finishing tenth for the championship. He returned in 2019 as a guest driver.

Career results

† Guest driver.

References

External links
 
 Profile at Brabham Dynasty
 

1994 births
Living people
Sam
Australian racing drivers
English racing drivers
Formula Ford drivers
MRF Challenge Formula 2000 Championship drivers
Porsche Carrera Cup GB drivers